Petrophila canadensis, the Canadian petrophila moth, is a moth in the family Crambidae. It was described by Eugene G. Munroe in 1972. It is found in North America, where it has been recorded from southern Canada and the north-eastern United States.

Its wingspan is 11–18 mm. The hindwings have two transverse brownish bands, separated by a white area. There is a triangular patch of fine black speckling. Adults are on wing from May to September in two generations per year.

The larvae are aquatic and feed on diatoms, including Navicula and Cymbella species. They have also been recorded feeding algae. The species overwinters as an adult.

References

Petrophila
Moths described in 1972